Banksia subulata, commonly known as the awled honeypot, is a species of bushy, prostrate shrub that is endemic to the southwest of Western Australia. It has long linear leaves with the edges turned under, yellowish green flowers in heads of about sixty and more or less spherical follicles.

Description
Banksia subulata is a bushy, prostrate shrub that typically grows to a width of  but does not form a lignotuber.

Taxonomy
This species was first published as Dryandra subulata in 1964 by Charles Gardner in the Journal of the Royal Society of Western Australia from specimens he collected near the Hill River.

In Alex George's 1996 arrangement, this species was recognised as quite distinctive, being unusual in its long, unserrated leaves, its rigid awl-shaped floral leaves, and its round follicles. With no obvious relatives, the species was placed alone in a new series named Dryandra ser. Subulatae.

Since 1998, Austin Mast has been publishing results of ongoing cladistic analyses of DNA sequence data for the subtribe Banksiinae. His analyses have provided evidence of the paraphyly of Banksia with respect to Dryandra; that is, it seems that Dryandra arose from within the ranks of Banksia. Early in 2007, Mast and Kevin Thiele initiated a rearrangement of Banksia by sinking Dryandra into it; Dryandra subulata thus became Banksia subulata. Mast's analyses placed B. subulata not with the other Dryandra species sampled, but rather within a small clade of Banksia species with independently reduced inflorescence axes. For this reason, B. subulata was placed incertae sedis in B. subg. Banksia, rather than in B. ser. Dryandra with the other Dryandra species.

Distribution and habitat
Banksia subulata grows in low kwongan between Eneabba and the Hill River.

Conservation status
This banksia is classified as "Priority Three" by the Government of Western Australia Department of Parks and Wildlife meaning that it is poorly known and known from only a few locations but is not under imminent threat.

References

subulata
Eudicots of Western Australia
Endemic flora of Western Australia
Plants described in 1964
Taxa named by Charles Gardner